El Tigre: The Adventures of Manny Rivera is a video game based on the Nickelodeon television series of the same name, published by THQ and released on October 29, 2007. The Nintendo DS version was developed by Barking Lizards. The PlayStation 2 version was developed by Blue Tongue. The PS2 game acts as a simple platformer over four levels and two bonus stages, the objective of the game being to collect "macho points". A Wii version was planned, but it was cancelled due to budget cuts and a short development cycle due to the show getting cancelled early.

References

El Tigre: The Adventures of Manny Rivera (infobox details) at GameSpot

2007 video games
Nintendo DS games
PlayStation 2 games
Nicktoons video games
THQ games
El Tigre: The Adventures of Manny Rivera video games
North America-exclusive video games
Video games developed in Australia
Video games scored by Mick Gordon
Cancelled Wii games
Single-player video games
Action video games
Blue Tongue Entertainment games
Barking Lizards games